Reporter TV is an Indian Malayalam language free to air news channel broadcasting in the Malayalam language. The channel is owned by Indo Asian News Channel Pvt Limited based at Kochi.

The channel was launched on 13 May 2011. M. V. Nikesh Kumar, a popular media person in Kerala, India, is the CEO of Reporter TV. During the time of launch, it was the first HD news channel from South India. The international office of the Reporter TV is at Dubai Media City.

List of programs 

 Morning Reporter 
 Close Encounter
My Doctor
 Big Story
 Democrazy
 Editors Hour
 Middle East Reporter
 Meet The Editors
 E-Reporter
 Adayalam 
 News Night Show 
 Breaking Hours 
 News Room 360°
 Global News Hour
 Witness

Satellite information 

Satellite: Intelsat 17
Location: 66 Degree East
Format: MPEG4
Frequency: 4006 MHz
Down link polarization: Horizontal
Symbol rate: 14400 Ksps
Carrier type: DVB-S2
Modulation: 8PSK
FEC: 3/4

Reporter TV Placement In Digital Cable Networks

Cable Network                                                      Channel Number 

 Kerala Vision Digital TV    =                                                      28
 Asianet Digital                 =                                                       129
 Den Cable Network         =                                                       590
 Bhoomika                      =                                                         32
 KCL                                =                                                        169
 Idukkivision Digital        =                                                          32
 SITI                           =                                                              148
 Digi Media                =                                                               135
 Malanad                  =                                                                 45
 Satlinks                       =                                                             412
 YES                           =                                                               64
 Star Digital               =                                                                 35
 Keranad                 =                                                                   65
 DMV Kochi        =                                                                        26
 Atulya Info Media  =                                                                    137
 Indian Cable Attapady =                                                                36

DTH Network 

 Sun Direct = 228

References
Reporter Digital

Reporter Digital Links

https://www.reporter.live/news/(Malayalam News Website )

https://www.reporter.live/(English News Website)

https://www.youtube.com/channel/UCFx1nseXKTc1Culiu3neeSQ(YouTube Channel)

https://twitter.com/reporter_tv(Twitter)
https://twitter.com/reportertv_news

https://www.facebook.com/reporterlive/(Facebook Page)

Malayalam-language television channels
Television stations in Kochi
Television channels and stations established in 2011
2011 establishments in Kerala